The 2014 Copa Petrobrás de Marcas season was the fourth season of the Brasileiro de Marcas. It began on April 6 at Tarumã and ended on November 23 at Brasília, after fifteen races.

JLM Racing driver Ricardo Maurício won his third consecutive Brasileiro de Marcas title, taking three victories during the season including a win with Max Wilson in the wildcard race at Interlagos. Consistency was the key to his title, finishing all but one race in the top nine placings, sealing it with a third-place finish in the opening race at the final round at Goiânia. Maurício's championship-winning margin was three points – after dropped scores were implemented – over his team-mate Vicente Orige, a race-winner at Goiânia, taking advantage of the series' double-points rules for the final meeting. Despite missing the first round, Allam Khodair finished third in the championship, also with three victories.

Other drivers to take victories during the season were Gabriel Casagrande, who won races at Brasília and Curitiba, while Vítor Meira (Tarumã), Galid Osman (Goiânia), Thiago Camilo (Curitiba, on a one-off appearance), as well as Velopark winners Alceu Feldmann and Denis Navarro, all took single race victories during the season. With the performances of Maurício and Orige, JLM Racing were the winners of the teams' championship, comfortably ahead of RZ Motorsport Toyota, with their drivers Khodair and Osman. In the manufacturers' championship, Toyota finished 14 points clear of Honda to win the championship.

Teams and drivers
All drivers were Brazilian-registered.

Race calendar and results
All races were held in Brazil.

Championship standings
Points were awarded as follows:

Drivers' Championship

Manufacturers' Championship

Teams' Championship

References

External links
  

Marcas
Touring car racing series